The 2000–01 Tampa Bay Lightning season was the Lightning's ninth season of operation. The club again failed to make the playoffs for the fifth consecutive season.

Off-season

Regular season
After 39 games, the Lightning fired coach Steve Ludzik and replaced him with John Tortorella. Ludzik finished with a record of 12–20–5–2 for the season. Tortorella would have a slightly worse record the rest of the way, finishing 12–27–1–3.

Final standings

Game log

Player stats

Awards and records
2001 NHL All-Star Game Super Skills:
Hardest Shot - Fredrik Modin - 102.1 mph

Transactions

Draft picks
Tampa Bay's draft picks at the 2000 NHL Entry Draft held at the Pengrowth Saddledome in Calgary, Alberta.

See also
2000–01 NHL season

References
 

Tam
Tam
Tampa Bay Lightning seasons
Tamp
Tamp